Sepolta viva (internationally released as Woman Buried Alive) is an Italian drama film directed by Aldo Lado. The film obtained a great commercial success and launched a short-living revival of "feuilleton films". It has a sequel, Il figlio della sepolta viva.

Cast 
Agostina Belli: Christine
Maurizio Bonuglia: Ferdinand
Fred Robsahm: Philippe 
Dominique Darel: Dominique de Fontenoy 
Laura Betti: Giovanna la pazza
José Quaglio: Morel
Francis Perrin: Gael

References

External links

 
1973 films
Italian drama films
Films scored by Ennio Morricone
1973 drama films
1970s Italian films